Ooperipatus birrgus is a species of velvet worm in the Peripatopsidae family. This species has 15 pairs of legs. It is found in New South Wales, Australia.

References

Onychophorans of Australasia
Onychophoran species
Animals described in 2000